Karim Ayman El Hammamy (born November 4, 1995 in Cairo) is a professional squash player who represented Egypt. He reached a career-high world ranking of World No. 55 in March, 2017.

References

External links 

Egyptian male squash players
Living people
1995 births
Sportspeople from Cairo
21st-century Egyptian people